The Irish showband was a dance band format popular in Ireland from the mid-1950s to mid-1980s. The showband was based on the internationally popular six- or seven-piece dance band. The band's basic repertoire included standard dance numbers and covers of pop music hits. The versatile music ranged from rock and roll and country and western songs to traditional dixieland jazz and even Irish Céilí dance, Newfie stomps, folk music and waltzes. Key to a showband's popular success was the ability to perform songs currently in the record charts. Some bands also did comedy skits onstage.

The line-up usually featured a rhythm section of drums, lead, rhythm and bass guitars, a keyboard instrument, and a brass section of trumpet, saxophone and trombone. The band was fronted by one or two lead singers, who were assisted by other band members on backing vocals. Comedy routines were sometimes featured. The Irish showband, unlike the big band, played standing, and members would often step, dip and bop in the manner of Bill Haley & His Comets or a black soul band, which brought more energy to the performance. Initially, the bands' tours were limited to Irish venues. As the scene progressed, the more successful bands toured Irish clubs in Britain, the United States and Canada. Some later rock- and soul-oriented showbands toured the German nightclub circuit and US Army base clubs in Europe.

History

1940s–50s: Big band era 
In the 1940s and 1950s "orchestras" were popular in Ireland. These were dance bands usually with ten to fifteen musicians, and sometimes more. They wore dress suits and dickey bows. Often there would be a brass band based in the town where the orchestra came from and the orchestra members would have learned to play instruments in this brass band. They sat down and read sheet music from stands. Many of them took the format of American big bands from the 1940s, such as the Glenn Miller Orchestra, with instrumental music to the fore providing the backdrop to a long night's dancing which could be up to five hours long (e.g., 9 PM to 2 AM). Popular orchestras from the time were those of Maurice Mulcahy and Jimmy Wiley (both from Mitchelstown) Mick Delahunty (from Clonmel), Brose Walsh (from Castlebar), and Jack Ruane (from Ballina).

Big bands turn into showbands 
As singing and singers became more popular and instrumental tunes less popular, the orchestras downsized and morphed into showbands, dropping brass players, going from eight or ten brass down to three or four. The Maurice Mulcahy Orchestra went from fifteen members, five saxophones, four trumpets, one trombone, rhythm section and a singer in the early sixties to ten members in the early seventies, which included two singers but still held five brass, four saxophones and one trumpet, which would have been a large band for the seventies.

Dave Glover renamed his group to the Dave Glover Showband in 1955, pioneering the use of the word "showband"; he chose the name because he wanted to indicate that their act incorporated both music and skits.

Strabane's Clipper Carlton are credited with being the first popular showband. Fronted by Fergie O'Hagan, they were originally a touring big band. They later became popular in Britain and on the U.S. and Canadian Irish club circuit. Brendan Bowyer, Tom Dunphy and the Royal Showband from Waterford toured professionally around 1958, and became a crowd-drawing success. They were managed by the promoter T.J. Byrne and were the first such band to have a record enter the Irish charts: "Come Down From The Mountain, Katie Daly", sung by Dunphy. Later, Brendan Bowyer had a hit with "The Hucklebuck", an American recording from the 1940s.

The Freshmen from Ballymena, Antrim, led by Billy Brown and Derek Dean, combined to produce harmonies on their covers of hits by The Beach Boys and Jan and Dean. Dickie Rock performed mainly big ballads. Starting out with Dublin's Melochords, he became a star with The Miami Showband, and later represented Ireland in the Eurovision Song Contest in 1967.

At its height in the mid-1960s, there were as many as 800 full and part-time bands travelling the country. The business as a whole employed many thousands of musicians, support staff and managers.

Other popular bands in the sixties included those of Michael O'Callaghan (from Buttevant), The Dixies (from Cork), and Donie Collins (from Askeaton).

Embracing rock and soul 
A second wave of specialty bands emerged in the late sixties and early seventies. The 'second wave' bands were young proponents of a rock, blues and soul style. These bands included The Dreas, The Real McCoy, The Arrows and The Chessmen. They were most popular in urban areas, while Country and Western leaning bands were generally more popular in the rural areas of the country. Big Tom and the Mainliners and Larry Cunningham and the Mighty Avons were a huge summer marquee carnival dance draws alongside Margo, Philomena Begley and Brendan Shine.

Decline of the showbands 
By the mid-1970s the phenomenon had peaked, and was in decline. A number of factors contributed to their drop in popularity, including the advent of upscale discothèque, the opening of hotel music lounges and cabaret rooms (with alcohol licenses), and changing musical tastes.

In July 1975 members of the Ulster Volunteer Force killed three members of The Miami Showband, one of Ireland's biggest showbands, including lead singer Fran O'Toole, and wounded two others. The killings, which occurred as the band was returning from a show in Banbridge in Northern Ireland, became known as the Miami Showband killings. Cross-border band touring dropped significantly as a result, which hastened the decline of the showbands.

Of the bands that did not break up entirely, many reduced their numbers and revamped into small pop rock or country music ensembles.

Ballrooms and dance halls 
The city ballrooms were often purpose built and lavish. Most rural dance halls, on the other hand, were simple barn-like buildings at the edge of the town. Painted and lit in bright colours inside and out, they had fanciful romantic names such as "Fairyland", "Dreamland", "Wonderland" and "Arcadia". Dance halls in smaller towns and villages would host a dance once or twice a month. The fans often travelled miles from the surrounding countryside to see their favourite band. Some city ballrooms were lavish dance palaces from an earlier era. The Mecca in Belfast, Dublin's Town and Country Club (a Corinthian pillared ballroom in the Georgian era), Rotunda Rooms, the Metropole and the TV Club were prominent among the plusher venues.

Most rural dance halls were roughly constructed in cheap materials by local entrepreneurs. Breeze block pebbled Irish garage architecture prevailed. They had benches along the side walls, usually women on one side of the hall and men on the other. The smell of Jeyes Fluid from the crude rest rooms was a common smell of the time. A chain of venues in the midlands was operated by Albert Reynolds, who would later become Taoiseach of the Republic. Associated Ballrooms was owned by mining magnate Con Hynes. The Lucey brothers had large ballrooms in Cork. In the North East, the Adelphi ballroom, owned by Dee O'Kane and Jimmy Hamilton in Dundalk, attracted audiences from both sides of the border. Summer dancing was held in wet and windy marquees during parish carnivals throughout the country. "Mineral Bars" dispensed ham sandwiches, potato crisps, hot beverages and soft drinks.

Ballrooms and dance halls did not sell alcoholic beverages. Alcohol sales remained the prerogative of the local pub, who then began to build extensions onto pubs and operate their own disco or cabaret show.

Legacy 
Various internationally successful Irish singers and musicians began their careers in showbands, including Van Morrison, Henry McCullough, Mick Hanly, Rory Gallagher, Eric Bell, Eric Wrixon and Colm Wilkinson.

The 1987 Roddy Doyle novel The Commitments is about a contemporary group of unemployed Irish youths who start a soul band in the manner of the late-1960s Irish showbands. The novel spawned a popular 1991 film of the same name, which in turn led to a touring band, The Stars from the Commitments, and a 2013 musical, The Commitments.

The 2005 Irish TV movie Showbands and its 2006 sequel, Showbands II, both starred Liam Cunningham as the manager of a struggling Irish showband in the mid-1960s.

In 2010, Ireland's postal service, An Post, issued a set of four commemorative stamps depicting four of Ireland's biggest showbands: The Drifters, The Freshmen, The Miami Showband and The Royal Showband. An An Post spokesman said that the showbands "rocked Irish society from its postwar depression".

In March 2019, Ardal O'Hanlon presented a BBC Four documentary about the showband phenomenon.

References and sources 
Notes

Sources

Further reading 
Times Pictorial (3 March 1945) "This Is a Jam Session". Irish Times.
Larkin, Colin (21 August 2012). "Ireland ... and all that jazz". Irish Times.

External links 
Irish-showbands.com – Irish Showbands
Irishshowbands.net – Irish Showbands & Beat-Groups Archive
Ian Gallagher's Showband Memories
Jivenaires.com – List & images of well-known showbands
irishshowbandalbum.com – photos + music

Showband
20th century in music
Types of musical groups